1942 Meistaradeildin was the inaugural season of Meistaradeildin, the top tier of the Faroese football league system. It was performed in knockout rounds rather than in a league format. KÍ Klaksvík defeated TB Tvøroyri by 4–1 in the championship final.

Qualifying round

East

Preliminary
The first leg was played on 21 June and the second leg on 28 June.

|}

Final
The first leg was played on 5 July and the second leg on 19 July.

|}

West

Preliminary
The first leg was played on 14 June and the second leg on 28 June.

|}

Final
The first leg was played on 12 July and the second leg on 19 July.

|}

South

Preliminary
The match was played on 14 June. A second leg was planned to be played on 21 June, but SVB withdrew after the first leg.

|}

Final
The match was played on 28 June. A second leg was planned to be played on 5 July, but Royn withdrew.

|}

Semi-finals
Match played on 26 July.

|}

Final
The match was played on 29 July.

|}

References

External links
Faroe Islands Premier League at Faroe Soccer (choose 1942)
Faroe Islands League final tables 1942–1950 by webalice.it
Faroese champions list by RSSSF

Meistaradeildin seasons
Faroe
Faroe